Aleksei Vladimirovich Churavtsev (born 1 April 1984) is a Russian former professional football player.

Club career
He made his Russian Football National League debut for FC Lada Togliatti on 20 April 2001 in a game against FC Neftekhimik Nizhnekamsk.

External links
 

1984 births
Living people
Russian footballers
Association football forwards
FC Lada-Tolyatti players
FC Neftyanik Ufa players
FC Sokol Saratov players
FC Gornyak Uchaly players
FC Volga Ulyanovsk players